A by-election was held for the New South Wales Legislative Assembly electorate of Liverpool Plains on 10 August 1860 because of the resignation of Andrew Loder.

Dates

Result

Andrew Loder resigned.

See also
Electoral results for the district of Liverpool Plains
List of New South Wales state by-elections

References

1860 elections in Australia
New South Wales state by-elections
1860s in New South Wales